Gloria Olienka Giovanna Salinas López (born 16 November 1973), known as Olienka Salinas, is a Peruvian former football and futsal player and current manager. She is the Peruvian football and futsal team all-time-top-scorer with 7 and 9 goals respectively. Since 2018 she has been part of the technical staff of the Sporting Cristal women's football team that participates in the Peruvian women's football championship.

Early life and club career 
Olienka started playing soccer when she was 5 years-old in her hometown, Chimbote. In January 1997 she traveled to Lima to do tests at Sporting Cristal and eventually was selected. She played for Sporting Cristal until 2000 and during this period she won the National Championship three times (1998, 1999, 2000). Also she won and was the top scorer of the 2000 Sudamerican club women's football championship, an «experimental» tournament was organized by Peruvian Football Federation and can be considered as a precedent for the Copa Libertadores Femenina (Female Copa Libertadores).

The Sporting Cristal women's football team disappeared and Olienka continued her career in Sport Boys where she became top scorer of the 2002 National Championship. Olienka retired from football in 2005.

Since 2004 until 2009, Olienka played for Universidad San Martín female futsal team and competed in the Peruvian Metropolitan Women's Championship. She won the 2006 championship and was the top scorer in both 2006 and 2007.

International career 
Olienka was part of the Peru women's national football team that played the 1998 South American Women's Football Championship and finished third, currently its best performance. Olienka scored 5 goals that time and 2 more in the 2003 South American Women's Football Championship.

Olianka also played for the Perú women's national futsal team. She scored 7 goals in the 2005 South American Women's Futsal Championship, 2 goals in the 2007 South American Women's Futsal Championship, and participated in the 2009 South American Women's Futsal Championship where she didn't score.

Participations in the South American Women's Football Championship 
Olienka has participated in two South American Women's Football Championship.

Goals in the South American Women's Football Championship

Participations in the South American Women's Futsal Championship 
Olienka has participated in two South American Women's Futsal Championship.

Managerial career 
Olienka founded the Olienka Salinas Women's Football School and started managing. Later, she took over Fuerza Cristal, a female football club that played  Peruvian women's football championship but without Sporting Cristal support. In 2018, Cristal refounded its women's football section based in the Fuerza Cristal team and Olienka became a member of the technical staff.

Since 2017, Olienka is part of the Peru women's national football team technical staff in all of its categories: absolute, U-20, U-17, U-15, futsal, etc.

Olienka is also the manager of the Franklin Delano Roosevelt School female football team and manager of the men and women Universidad Ricardo Palma futsal team.

Honours and achievements

Player

National championships

International championships

Manager

National championships

Personal life 
Olienka is a Systems engineer graduated from Universidad de San Martín de Porres and also studied Physical Education at the National University of San Marcos. She also has studies in Sports Management and owns the Olienka Salinas Women's Football School.

See also 
 JC Sport Girls

References

External links 
 
 Olienka Salinas on Facebook.
 Olienka Salinas on Twitter.

1973 births
Living people
Female association football managers
Peru women's international footballers
Peruvian football managers
Peruvian women's footballers
Peruvian women's futsal players
Sport Boys footballers
Sporting Cristal footballers
Women's association football forwards
Women's association football midfielders